I'm a Celebrity...Get Me Out of Here! returned for its twenty-first series on 21 November 2021 on ITV. As with series 20, due to COVID-19 travel restrictions, the series was filmed at Gwrych Castle in Abergele, Wales.

Ant & Dec returned to host the series. In October 2021, it was announced that the online spin-off show I'm a Celebrity...The Daily Drop had been axed, with no plans for a replacement.

On 12 December, Danny Miller was crowned the first ever ‘King of the Castle’.

Production
On 2 August 2021, it was announced that, due to Australia's border remaining closed amid COVID-19 restrictions in the country, filming would again be taking place at Gwrych Castle in Abergele, Wales, instead of Murwillumbah, New South Wales, Australia. As part of the agreement with Gwrych Castle Preservation Trust, ITV announced it would continue to help support the ongoing restoration project of the site.

The first trailer for the series was released on 22 October 2021, featuring Ant & Dec dressed up in knight's armour galloping through the Welsh countryside, whilst it was teased that the series would be "more gruelling than ever".

The live elements of the show on 26 November had to be pre-recorded for the first time in the show's history due to adverse weather conditions from Storm Arwen. On 27 November, the celebrities were temporarily removed from the castle and the episodes on 27, 28 and 29 November were cancelled due to safety fears and technical difficulties as a result of the storm.  The show resumed on 30 November.

Celebrities
The line-up was announced on 15 November 2021. Adam Woodyatt and Simon Gregson were confirmed by ITV on 24 November as the annual late arrivals. On 25 November, Richard Madeley was forced to withdraw from the series after being taken to hospital due to an unspecified illness, and therefore breaking the show's COVID bubble. Posting online, Madeley said: "I started to feel briefly unwell in the small hours of the morning and was taken to hospital as a precaution."

Results and elimination
 Indicates that the celebrity received the most votes from the public
 Indicates that the celebrity received the fewest votes and was eliminated immediately (no bottom two)
 Indicates that the celebrity was named as being in the bottom two

 The public voted for who they wanted to win, rather than save.

Trials
The contestants take part in daily trials to earn food. These trials aim to test both physical and mental abilities. The winner is usually determined by the number of stars collected during the trial, with each star representing a meal earned by the winning contestant for their fellow celebrities.
 
 The public voted for who they wanted to face the trial
 The contestants decided who would face the trial
 The trial was compulsory and neither the public nor celebrities decided who took part
 

 For the first time in the show's history, the vote for the first trial opened a week before the series began, with the public deciding who would be facing the first trial. The winning celebrity would move their team into Main Camp, while the losing celebrity's team moved into the Castle Clink - where they slept on the floor and endured cold showers until the camps were merged on Day 4.
 The celebrities competed in this trial to win meals for their camp, while the losing team spent the night with basic rations of rice and beans. 
 As both Danny and Snoochie completed all 10 dishes (5 each), a tie breaker was needed to decide who would win the trial. As Danny finished his drink first, he won the trial.
 As punishment for losing the first trial, the team in the Castle Clink faced the public vote for this trial. The team in Main Camp chose who faced the trial for them.
 Main Camp faced the public vote for this trial, then they selected who faced them from the Castle Clink.
 As lords of the castle, Adam and Simon were exempt from the public vote for trials.
 Naughty Boy was chosen by the public to compete in the trial, whilst lords of the castle Adam and Simon were told they would participate also.
 Matty automatically faced this trial after selecting the coin in the Wishing Well challenge.

Star count

Castle Coin challenges
As well as competing in the trials, celebrities have to complete 'Castle Coin Challenges' in order to earn treats for themselves. At least 2 celebrities will be chosen to compete in the challenge. They must complete the challenge they have been given in order to win 'Castle Coins'. After completion of the challenge, the celebrities will take the Castle Coins and head to the Ye Olde Shoppe, where they will purchase one of two snack options, from Kiosk Cledwyn. But, before they are allowed to take the prize, the other celebrities back at the living quarters must answer a question, based on a recent survey. If they get the question right, they will earn the treat, but if they get it wrong, the celebrities will go back empty handed.

 The celebrities got the question correct
 The celebrities got the question wrong
 No challenge or questions were given.

 Danny, Matty and Snoochie were chosen to compete in a challenge to win 20 Castle Coins. After completing the challenge, instead of visiting Ye Olde Shoppe and having to answer a question, lords of the castle Adam and Simon were given a list of treats to choose from, each costing 5 Castle Coins each.

Ratings
Official ratings are taken from BARB, utilising the four-screen dashboard which includes viewers who watched the programme on laptops, smartphones, and tablets within 7 days of the original broadcast.

References

External links
 

21
2021 British television seasons 
Television shows filmed in Wales
Television shows set in Wales
COVID-19 pandemic in the United Kingdom
Television series impacted by the COVID-19 pandemic